State Route 159 (SR 159) is a primary state highway in the U.S. state of Virginia. Known as Dunlap Creek Road, the state highway runs  from SR 311 at Crows north to Interstate 64 (I-64) and U.S. Route 60 (US 60) at Callaghan. SR 159 forms part of the old alignment of US 60 in western Alleghany County.

All of SR 159 is a Virginia Byway.

Route description

SR 159 begins at a wye intersection with SR 311 (Kanawha Trail) in the hamlet of Crows in southwestern Alleghany County. The state highway heads northeast and parallels Dunlap Creek through its valley between Peters Mountain to the east and Brushy Mountain to the west. SR 159 passes through the hamlets of Hematite and Moss Run within the valley. As the state highway approaches Callaghan, it veers away from the creek and passes under CSX's Alleghany Subdivision. SR 159 crosses Ogle Creek just before intersecting SR 600 (Midland Trail), the old alignment of US 60. The state highway crosses Dunlap Creek once more before terminating within its partial diamond interchange with I-64 and US 60, which runs concurrently with I-64 west from the interchange toward West Virginia. The roadway continues east as US 60 (Midland Trail) toward Covington.

Major intersections

References

External links

Virginia Highways Project: VA 159

159
State Route 159
159